Webnode is an online website builder system, and developed by Westcom, s.r.o, a company based in Brno, Czech Republic. It can be compared with other online systems like Weebly or WIX.

The website builder is known for its simplicity and allows users to create a site by dragging and dropping elements such as blogs, photo galleries and much more.

History 

Westcom, Ltd. started development of Webnode in September 2006 and officially launched 16 months later in January 2008.

Originally since 2002, the developer company Westcom had created online applications for large customers and had developed a system they could use for making it easier for programmers to launch and create new websites. From this framework system came the idea of creating a website builder tool for non-technical users.

First the Czech version was launched and then the Slovak one became operational in early June. By the end of 2008 Webnode had more than 200,000 users in more than 80 countries around the world, including the United States, Spain and China. Two years later, in 2010, its user base raised to more than 2,000,000 users and it had 12 language versions.

Features 
Webnode is a drag-and-drop online website builder with 3 different website solutions: Personal websites, Business websites and e-commerce websites.

The system can be run on most Internet browsers such as Internet Explorer, Mozilla Firefox, Netscape, Google Chrome, Safari and Opera.

One feature of Webnode is the possibility of creating and editing the website from a smartphone with connection to Internet.

Service 
The system is offered under the Freemium business model having a free offer with limitations, and the possibility to upgrade to Premium packages which offer more storage space, bandwidth and extra features.

Awards and Recognitions 
 Silver winner at Startup Competition at LeWeb'08 Paris

See also
Website builder

References

External links
 

Content management systems
Free web hosting services
Website management
Blog software
Online companies of the Czech Republic
Web development software
Multilingual websites